Urengoy may refer to:
Urengoy, an urban-type settlement in Yamalo-Nenets Autonomous Okrug, Russia
Urengoy gas field in Yamalo-Nenets Autonomous Okrug, Russia
Novy Urengoy, a town in Yamalo-Nenets Autonomous Okrug, Russia